Givemore Khupe (born 20 December 1999) is a South African footballer who currently plays as a centre back for Moroka Swallows.

Career statistics

Club

Notes

References

1999 births
Living people
South African soccer players
Association football defenders
National First Division players
Cape Umoya United F.C. players
Moroka Swallows F.C. players
South Africa under-20 international soccer players